WZIQ (106.5 FM) is a Christian radio station licensed to serve Smithville, Georgia, United States.  The station is owned by Augusta Radio Fellowship Institute, Inc.

It airs a contemporary Christian format and is an affiliate of the "Good News Network".

The station was assigned the call WXAA letters by the Federal Communications Commission on May 17, 1992.  On May 15, 1993, the station changed its call sign to the current WZIQ.

References

External links

Moody Radio affiliate stations
Radio stations established in 1992
ZIQ